Donuca spectabilis, the white-spotted owl-moth, is a moth of the family Noctuidae. The species was first described by Francis Walker in 1865. It is found in most of mainland Australia.

The wingspan is about 50 mm.

The larvae feed on Acacia saligna.

References

Catocalina